XHJGMI-TDT, physical channel 15 and virtual channel 12, is a television station in Uruapan, Michoacán. The station is owned by Corporativo Trejo and is known as Multimedios Televisión (no relation to the Multimedios Televisión network), part of a larger media group known as Multimedios Michoacán.

History
XHJGMI was awarded in the IFT-6 TV station auction of 2017 and signed on February 12, 2018. It was assigned virtual channel 12 in August 2018.

References 

2018 establishments in Mexico
Television channels and stations established in 2018
Television stations in Michoacán